Bristol is a city and county in the South-west of England.

Bristol may also refer to:

Businesses
Bristol Aeroplane Company, an early British aviation company
Bristol Aerospace, a Canadian aerospace firm
Bristol Boats, an Indian fibreglass boat manufacturer 
Bristol Cars, a British manufacturer of luxury cars
Bristol Commercial Vehicles, a British manufacturer of buses and trucks
Bristol Omnibus Company, a British bus operator
Bristol Paint, an Australian decorating supplies company

Places

Canada
Bristol, Quebec
Bristol, New Brunswick
Bristol, Nova Scotia

United Kingdom
Bristol Airport
Bristol Castle
Bristol (European Parliament constituency), existed 1979–1999
Bristol (UK Parliament constituency), existed 1295–1885

United States
Bristol Bay, Alaska
Bristol Mountains, California
Bristol, Colorado
Bristol, Connecticut
Bristol, Florida
Bristol, Georgia
Bristol, Illinois
Bristol, Indiana
Bristol, Maine
Bristol, Maryland
Bristol County, Massachusetts
Bristol Township, Minnesota
Bristol, New Hampshire, a town
Bristol (CDP), New Hampshire, the main village in the town
Bristol, New York
Bristol, Perry County, Ohio
Bristol Township, Morgan County, Ohio
Bristol, Pennsylvania
Bristol Township, Pennsylvania
Bristol, Rhode Island
Bristol County, Rhode Island
Bristol, South Dakota
Bristol, Tennessee
Bristol, Texas
Bristol, Vermont, a town
Bristol (CDP), Vermont, the main settlement in the town
Bristol, Virginia
Bristol (village), Wisconsin
Bristol, Dane County, Wisconsin, a town
Bristol (town), Kenosha County, Wisconsin, a former town

Elsewhere
Bristol Island, of the South Sandwich Islands
Playa Bristol, a beach in Mar del Plata, Argentina

Ships
Bristol (1866 steamboat), an American steamboat
HMS Bristol (1653), a 48-gun ship
HMS Bristol (1711), a 54-gun fourth-rate
HMS Bristol (1775), a 50-gun fourth-rate
HMS Agincourt (1796) or HMS Bristol, a 64-gun third-rate
HMS Bristol (1861), a wooden screw frigate
HMS Bristol (1910), a Town-class light cruiser
HMS Bristol (D23), a unique Type-82-class destroyer launched in 1973
USS Bristol (DD-453), a Gleaves-class destroyer commissioned in 1941
USS Bristol (DD-857), Allen M. Sumner-class destroyer commissioned in 1945
USS Arthur L. Bristol (APD-97), a United States Navy high-speed transport in commission from 1945 to 1946
A subclass of the Town class cruiser ship class

Other uses
Bristol (solitaire), a card game
Bristol blue glass
Bristol board, a type of paper
Bristol F.2 Fighter, a biplane aircraft
Bristol Motor Speedway, a NASCAR racetrack in Tennessee
Bristol Bears, a rugby union club in England
Bristol Stool Scale, a human faeces classification chart
Bristol wrench, a hand tool
Hotel Bristol, a common hotel name
Marquess of Bristol, a title in the British aristocracy
 Caenorhabditis elegans var Bristol, a historic subspecies of C. elegans worms

People with the surname
Arthur L. Bristol (1886–1942), U.S. Navy admiral
Dave Bristol (born 1933), American baseball manager
Johnny Bristol (1939–2004), American musician
Kenny Bristol (born 1952), Guyanese boxer 
Kervin Bristol (born 1988), Haitian basketball player
Mark Lambert Bristol, U.S. Navy admiral
Nathan Bristol (1805–1874), American merchant and politician 
Wheeler H. Bristol (1818–1904), American engineer and politician

People with the given name
Bristol Palin (born 1990), American personality and real estate agent

See also
Bristol Airport (disambiguation)
Bristol College (disambiguation)
Bristol County (disambiguation)
Bristol Hotel, numerous hotels
Bristol station (disambiguation)
List of places called Bristol